Kunt u mij de weg naar Hamelen vertellen, mijnheer? (Do you know the way to Hamelin, Sir ?; lit. Can you tell me the way to Hamelin, sir?) is a Dutch children's television series from the 1970s. It was broadcast by KRO and became an instant success.

Overview
Based on the fairy tale "The Pied Piper of Hamelin", it tells what happened with the children after they disappeared from this German town.

When The Piedpiper solves the rat problem in the town of Hamelin The Mayor refuses to pay him his gold so out of revenge he disappears with all the children of the town and 4 adults (Bertram Bierenbroodspot, his fiancé and the daughter of the Mayor Lidwientje Walg, Gatekeeper Aernout Koffij and Town Crier Hildebrandt Brom), the alternate reality they find themselves in is an Alice in Wonderland-like adventure with flying pumpkins and carpets, mud fighting princes, dwarfs and witches, a love elixir, Wensela's melting ice palace and a lot more. The show featured over 120 songs.

Episodes
45 episodes were taped between 1972 and 1976; only the last six survive on tape, aside from a few compilations of the first episodes, as after broadcasting the tapes were wiped to be reused. A significant part of the erased material has been preserved by recording on a videocassette recorder, though in inferior quality.

Cast
Rob de Nijs; Bertram Bierenbroodspot: Son of cloth merchant Simon Bierenbroodspot
Ida Bons (Season 1)/Loeki Knol (Seasons 2-5); Lidwientje Walg: Bertram's fiancée and the daughter of Mayor Willem Walg
Ab Hofstee; Hildebrandt Brom: The Town Crier of Hamelin (is the only one who wasn't under the influence of The Pied Piper's music, because he kept his ears covered)
Martin Brozius; Aernout Koffij: Gatekeeper of Hamelin
Kinderkoor Henk van der Velde: Children of Hamelin

Reunions
In late 1989 KRO reran the final 6 episodes and footage from a 1976 one-off concert. Many of the actors reunited for a television appearance dressed in the same costumes. Another reunion followed eight years later; this time some of the original child actors were involved.

Musical
A musical version premièred on 13 October 2003 in Tilburg. Loeki Knol was the only original cast member involved, playing Lidwina Walg. The show also featured Chantal Janzen and Kim-Lian.

Cast:
René van Kooten: Bertram Bierenbroodspot
Chantal Janzen: Lidwientje Walg
Maarten Wansink: Hildebrandt Brom/Prince Roelof
Job Schuring: Aernout Koffij/Prince Koen
Michel Sorbach: Piedpiper/Gruizel Gruis/Guurt van Grasp
Ellis van Laarhoven: Wenzela/Mother of Hilletje
Loeki Knol: Lidwina Walg/Queen
Jan Elbertse: Ambtenaar Ogterop/Mayor Walg
Danny Rook: Prince Tor/Spicht
Kim-Lian van der Meij: Princess Madelein
Suzan Seegers: Hilletje Labberton
Martin Stritzko: Barend Stip

External links

 
 KindertTV website (in Dutch) contains much information about the series.

1972 Dutch television series debuts
1976 Dutch television series endings
Dutch children's television series
Dutch fantasy television series
Television shows set in Germany
Television shows based on fairy tales
Television about magic
Television series set in the Middle Ages
Television shows adapted into plays
Dutch-language television shows